The Egyption Party is a political party that calls for the establishment of a presidential parliamentary system, "an independent judiciary system" and an economic system where the state intervenes to prevent monopolization. It is currently led by Hussien Abuelatta

Recently, on May 30, 2019, the name of the Egyptian Revolution Party was changed to the Egyptians Party

References

External links
Egyption Party

2011 establishments in Egypt
Political parties in Egypt
Political parties established in 2011